Cochylis voxcana is a species of moth of the  family Tortricidae. It is found in the United States, including New Hampshire.

Taxonomy
Some sources list this species as a synonym of Cochylis hollandana.

References

Moths described in 1907
voxcana